Inkerman is a community in the Canadian province of New Brunswick on Inkerman Lake. It is located mainly on Route 113.

History

The place is named after the Battle of Inkerman in the Crimean War.

The area was once served by the Caraquet and Gulf Shore Railway, a section of which ran between Tracadie and Shippagan. In 2017, a 500 metre former railway bridge, then being used as part of the Sentier NB Trail, was destroyed by fire.

Notable people

See also
Inkerman Parish
List of communities in New Brunswick

References

Designated places in New Brunswick
Former municipalities in New Brunswick
Neighbourhoods in Grand Tracadie-Sheila